Cao Bo (born 14 May 1992) is a Chinese road and track cyclist, who last rode for UCI Continental team . He competed in the team pursuit event at the 2013 UCI Track Cycling World Championships.

References

External links

1992 births
Living people
Chinese track cyclists
Chinese male cyclists
Place of birth missing (living people)
21st-century Chinese people